Condinitha "Connie" Teaberry-Lindsey (born August 15, 1970,  in St. Louis, Missouri) is an American track and field athlete known for the high jump. She represented the United States at the 1996 Olympics, where she finished 18th.

She is now the Director of Cross Country, Track and Field Coach at Northern Illinois University.  She had previously competed for Kansas State where she was coached by Cliff Rovelto.  She was an NCAA finalist outdoors four straight years and indoors in 1990 and 1992.  In 2016, she was inducted into the Kansas State Hall of Fame.  She previously jumped for Lutheran High School North in St. Louis and had been high jumping since sixth grade. Connie was inducted into the St. Louis Sports Hall of Fame May 31, 2018 for her accomplishments.  Condinitha 'Connie' Teaberry-Lindsey is married to DeMarcus K. Lindsey.  The couple have two children Kameron M. Lindsey, and Kollan T. Lindsey.

References

Living people
1970 births
Track and field athletes from St. Louis
Athletes (track and field) at the 1996 Summer Olympics
American female high jumpers
Olympic track and field athletes of the United States
African-American female track and field athletes
Kansas State Wildcats women's track and field athletes
21st-century African-American sportspeople
21st-century African-American women
20th-century African-American sportspeople
20th-century African-American women